The Mystic Dam (and its gatehouse) are a historic dam and gatehouse between Lower and Upper Mystic Lakes in the suburbs north of Boston, Massachusetts. The dam was built in 1864–65 by the Charlestown Water Commission (Charlestown then being separate from Boston) as part of a water supply system.  It was located at a narrow point between the Lower and Upper Mystic Lakes, with its west end in Arlington and its east end in Medford.  The water system it was a part of eventually merged into the Metropolitan District Commission (MDC), predecessor to the Massachusetts Water Resources Authority (MWRA) and the Massachusetts Department of Conservation and Recreation (DCR).

Near its center is a spillway area consisting of a series of square columns constructed of granite blocks and a masonry apron. These columns are grooved on their inner faces to facilitate the installation of stop logs. A wooden walkway with a plank railing ran across the top of the dam. A wooden fish ladder was built, but removed at a later date. A gatehouse on the Medford side was used to connect the upper lake to a brick-lined aqueduct that delivered the water to Charlestown.

The dam and gatehouse were each listed on the National Register of Historic Places in 1990.  By the early 2000s, the dam was known to not be in very good condition, with failing spillway masonry, erosion, and other damage to the dam's stonework.  A major storm in 2006 flooded portions of the surrounding area, and highlighted the potential inability of the dam to handle a significant high-water event, leading to catastrophic flooding of downstream areas.  Between 2010 and 2012 major work was undertaken to improve the dam's condition.  A new spillway was constructed to the east of the old spillway, which received a new spillway apron.  Work was done on the embankments and the shores near the upper areas of the dam, and a new fish ladder and bridge were built.  The historic gatehouse was also rehabilitated, and modern controls were added, enabling improved control over the water levels behind the dam.

See also
Mystic Water Works, a period pumping station in Somerville
National Register of Historic Places listings in Arlington, Massachusetts
National Register of Historic Places listings in Medford, Massachusetts

References

Arlington, Massachusetts
Dams on the National Register of Historic Places in Massachusetts
Buildings and structures in Medford, Massachusetts
Dams completed in 1864
Infrastructure completed in 1862
Gatehouses (waterworks)
Water supply infrastructure on the National Register of Historic Places
National Register of Historic Places in Arlington, Massachusetts
National Register of Historic Places in Middlesex County, Massachusetts
1862 establishments in Massachusetts
Dams in Massachusetts
Dams with fish ladders